Battle for Donetsk is a topical video game by the independent Belgian game development company LuGus Studios. The game aims to raise awareness of the conflict between the Donetsk People's Republic and the Ukrainian government forces.
The game can be played in-browser with the Unity webplayer plugin or on Android devices.

At the beginning of the game, the player chooses either the Donetsk People's Republic, a separatist group in eastern Ukraine, or the Ukrainian government forces to fight a battle against the other party. However, the game cannot be won in a traditional way. At the end of each battle the player, regardless of their performance, is shown a "you lost" screen displaying the number of civilian casualties caused by their actions. To win the game, the player has to take no action for 60 seconds.

Battle for Donetsk was developed over a period of three weeks and was self-financed by LuGus Studios. The game was simultaneously released on 15 March 2015 on the Google Play Store and on the game's website.

Reception
The game has been widely noticed by the press, chiefly in the Ukrainian and Russian media. Two weeks after release, the Android version of the game had been downloaded more than 50,000 times. While the Play Store ratings show mostly positive reactions, some users question the intentions of the developer. LuGus Studios has stated it does not wish to take a political stance and does not condone violence and conflict.

References

External links
 
 Popular Science: http://www.popsci.com/fight-ukraine-war-your-browser
 Deutsche Welle: http://dw.de/p/1ExsT
 Het Belang van Limburg: http://m.hbvl.be/cnt/dmf20150330_01605199/genks-oorlogsspel-hype-in-oekraine-en-rusland

2015 video games
Android (operating system) games
Browser games
Platform games
Video games set in Ukraine
Video games developed in Belgium
War in Donbas fiction